Alli Willow is a French-Brazilian actress. Much of Willow's work is in Brazilian film and television. Her film credits include Bacurau and Three Summers.  Her television credits include The Chosen One, Girls from Ipanema and Dear Death.

Willow studied acting at the Lee Strasberg Theatre and Film Institute in New York City.

External links

Living people
French film actresses
French television actresses
Brazilian film actresses
Brazilian television actresses
Year of birth missing (living people)